Costeștii din Vale is a commune in Dâmbovița County, Muntenia, Romania. It is composed of three villages: Costeștii din Vale, Mărunțișu and Tomșani.

Natives
 (b. 1947), writer
I. C. Vissarion (1883–1951), writer and inventor, one-time village mayor

References

Communes in Dâmbovița County
Localities in Muntenia